The Art Museum Partnership (2005–2012) was a New York City-based non-profit organization that provided the nonprofit art museums with educational opportunities that facilitate the sharing of information, resources, and collections. The Partnership was primarily established to benefit the small to medium-sized museums that comprise the largest segment in the field. However, larger museums were encouraged to participate, since the challenges in the field are universal and all participants benefit from the knowledge of their peers. The Art Museum Partnership was open to the leaders of all nonprofit art institutions regardless of size or focus.

The Directors Forum was the signature program of the Art Museum Partnership. The two-and-a-half-day annual conference for museum directors featured panel discussions with some of the most distinguished professionals in the art world. It was held October at renowned museums and cultural institutions in New York City. The goal of this annual conference was to engage museum leaders throughout the nation in an exchange of views on issues of mutual concern.

References

Museum associations and consortia
Culture of New York City
American art
Arts organizations based in New York City
Organizations established in 2005
Organizations disestablished in 2012
2005 establishments in New York City
2012 disestablishments in New York (state)